David Škoch (born 6 November 1976) is a professional doubles tennis player from the Czech Republic. He was the Wimbledon boys' singles champion in 1992.

In 2012–2019 he played in ITF tournaments with Petr Nouza, recently in May 2019 in Jablonec nad Nisou. In July 2019 he took 838 in ATP doubles ranking, after Nenad Zimonjić he is the second oldest player on the circuit and the oldest active Czech professional tennis player.

Junior Grand Slam finals

Singles: 1 (1 title)

Performance timeline

Doubles

ATP career finals

Doubles: 11 (5 titles, 6 runner-ups)

ATP Challenger and ITF Futures finals

Singles: 4 (3–1)

Doubles: 59 (26–33)

External links
 
 

1976 births
Living people
Czech male tennis players
People from Brandýs nad Labem-Stará Boleslav
Tennis players from Prague
Wimbledon junior champions
Grand Slam (tennis) champions in boys' singles